USS George Eastman (YAG-39), a "Liberty-type" cargo ship, was laid down under Maritime Commission contract on 24 March 1943 by Permanente Metals Corp., Yard 2, Richmond, California; launched on 20 April 1943; sponsored by Mrs. Ann Troutman; and delivered under charter from War Shipping Administration to Pacific-Atlantic Steamship Co., Vancouver, Washington, on 5 May 1943.

Merchant Cargo Carrier 
She operated as a merchant cargo carrier until placed in the National Defense Reserve Fleet at Suisun Bay, California, on 24 June 1948. Later taken out of reserve, she was chartered to Pacific Far East Line, Inc., San Francisco, California, on 24 December 1951 and operated as a merchantman in the Far East during the Korean War. On 2 June 1952 she was transferred by the Maritime Administration to the custody of the U.S. Navy at Suisun Bay, California.

Conversion to YAG-39 
Acquired by the U.S. Navy on 2 April 1953, she was designated YAG-39 the following month. She was then fitted out with numerous scientific instruments, including nuclear detection and measurement devices, which enabled her to conduct contamination and fallout measurement tests after nuclear explosions. Manned by an experimental crew in a specially protected control cubicle, she also was fitted with electronic remote control gear that enabled her to serve as a robot ship.

Supporting atomic testing in the Pacific 
Following extensive conversion, YAG-39 was placed in service at San Francisco, California, on 20 October 1953. Assigned to Joint Task Force 7, she steamed to Eniwetok, Marshall Islands, where from March through May 1954 she participated in atomic tests at the Pacific Proving Grounds. During "Operation Castle", a nuclear underwater test, she gathered fallout data and carried out experimental ship protection studies. After returning to San Francisco, California, she was placed out of service from June until February 1955.
 
In May, YAG-39 again served with Joint Task Force 7 during "Operation Wigwam", the deep underwater nuclear test carried out in the Eastern Pacific. During the next 10 months she operated between the West Coast and Hawaii, and conducted various experimental tests before returning to Eniwetok on 8 April 1956 to participate in additional nuclear tests. From 21 May to 23 July she took part in four nuclear-proving tests and gathered scientific data to advance knowledge of the atom and the effects of nuclear fission.
 
Departing Eniwetok on 28 July, YAG-39 steamed via Pearl Harbor to San Francisco, California, where she arrived on 16 August. After receiving additional scientific equipment, she departed San Francisco on 6 February 1957 to resume experimental operations off the California coast. During the next few months she steamed with   while testing advanced weapons and ship protection systems. Towed to San Diego, California, 21 October for inactivation, she was placed out of service on 1 November and assigned to the Pacific Reserve Fleet at San Diego.

Project 112 and Project SHAD 
Reactivated in 1962, YAG-39 commissioned at San Francisco, California, on 20 October. With her sister ship, YAG-40, she departed San Francisco, California, on 15 November for Pearl Harbor, where she arrived 24 November for underway training. Assigned to Service Squadron 5, she operated off Hawaii and carried out extensive experimental tests in the fields of ship protection systems and scientific warfare analysis. On 3 July 1963 she was assigned her former merchant name, George Eastman.
 
From 1963, USS George Eastman operated as a research ship between the Hawaiian Sea Frontier and the equatorial area of the mid-Pacific, providing valuable support for various scientific research and defense projects of the Department of Defense. She sailed to the West Coast in April 1966 for a three-month overhaul; and, following her return to Pearl Harbor on 18 August, she resumed research cruises in Hawaiian waters. Her support activities continued through 1966 into 1967.

This ship participated in the U. S. Navy's Top Secret biological and chemical warfare testing program. Project SHAD, an acronym for Shipboard Hazard and Defense, was part of a larger effort called Project 112, which was conducted during the 1960s. Project SHAD encompassed tests designed to identify U.S. warships' vulnerabilities to attacks with chemical or biological warfare agents and to develop procedures to respond to such attacks while maintaining a war-fighting capability.from 1962 until 1972 when President Nixon officially discontinued the program.  The USS George Eastmans sister ship, the  also participated as a floating laboratory and administrative command ship in Project SHAD along with five L.T. Tugboats, a submarine and aircraft.  Sarin and VX nerve gas were sprayed on the USS George Eastman by the tugs and aircraft as well as E.coli, simulants for biological and chemical agents such as anthrax and a number of other diseases, tracers and mosquitoes.

USS George Eastman directly participated in the following Project 112/ Project SHAD tests:
 63-1 Eager Belle I
 63-1 Eager Belle II
 64-2 Flower Drum I
 65-4 Magic Sword
 65-17 Fearless Johnny
 66-13 Half Note

Decommissioning 
USS George Eastman was decommissioned (date unknown); struck From the Naval Register (date unknown); disposed of by MARAD sale, on 1 July 1976; and, final disposition, scrapped in 1977.

See also 
 Research vessel
 Nuclear testing
 United States Navy Designations (Temporary)

References

External links 

Project 112/SHAD - Shipboard Hazard and Defense
The Chemical-Biological Warfare Exposures Site

Liberty ships
1943 ships
World War II merchant ships of the United States
Research vessels of the United States Navy